Terrie L. Suit (born October 3, 1964 in Orléans, France) is an American politician and businesswoman. A Republican, she was a member of the Virginia House of Delegates 2000–2008. In April 2011, she became the state's first Secretary of Veterans Affairs and Homeland Security, a position she held until September 2013.

Life and education
Suit attended Tidewater Community College where she received her associate degree. She later attended Old Dominion University where she earned a B.S. degree in political science.

Suit returned to Tidewater Community College in the spring of 2007 to give the graduation commencement address to the class of 2007. She is a Presbyterian.

Business career
Suit worked for a number of years in banking and finance as both an NASD licensed representative and as a mortgage loan officer.

Suit was a member of numerous civic organizations in the Hampton Roads area including the Chesapeake Farm Bureau, Hampton Roads Chamber of Commerce, South Hampton Roads BRAC Working Group and Virginia Republican Party State Central Committee. Suit has also won numerous awards including the John Marshall Award, the Hampton Roads Outstanding Professional Woman in Public Service, Virginia Women's Attorneys’ Association, Advocacy Award of Excellence and YWCA, Woman of Distinction.

Political career
Suit was a member of the Virginia House of Delegates from 2000 to 2008, representing the 81st district, which consisted of parts of the cities of Virginia Beach and Chesapeake. She was chair of the General Laws committee and Deputy House Whip in the 2008 session.

On September 9, 2008, Suit announced her retirement from the House, effective October 12. She cited the retirement of her husband, Tom, from the United States Navy, as influencing her own decision.

While Suit's initial plan was to join the government affairs team at the Law Firm of Williams Mullen, she left the firm after  one year to join the Cabinet of newly elected Governor Robert F. McDonnell, where she served initially as his Assistant for Commonwealth Preparedness, Senior Advisor on Military Relations, and Liaison to the Department of Homeland Security, and later as the Secretary of Veterans Affairs and Homeland Security.

Notes

External links

Living people
Members of the Virginia House of Delegates
State cabinet secretaries of Virginia
Old Dominion University alumni
Politicians from Virginia Beach, Virginia
Women state legislators in Virginia
1964 births
20th-century American politicians
20th-century American women politicians
21st-century American politicians
21st-century American women politicians
University of Mary Washington alumni